Debbie Downer is a fictional Saturday Night Live character who debuted in 2004, and was created and portrayed by Rachel Dratch.

Evolving from the character's popularity, the name Debbie Downer eventually became an established slang phrase referring to a pessimistic person who frequently adds bad news and negative feelings to a gathering, thus bringing down the mood of everyone around them. Although, according to dictionary.com, the phrase has been used since at least the 1970s. Dratch's character would usually appear at social gatherings and interrupt the conversation to voice negative opinions and pronouncements. She is especially concerned about the rate of feline AIDS, a subject that she would bring up on more than one occasion, saying it was the number one killer of domestic cats.

First appearance in 2003–04 season
The first appearance of Debbie Downer was on May 1, 2004, with guest host Lindsay Lohan. Debbie and five family members—played by Lohan, Jimmy Fallon, Dratch, Amy Poehler, Fred Armisen, and Horatio Sanz—are eating breakfast at a restaurant in Walt Disney World. While the family makes small talk, Debbie makes negative comments on worrying current events such as feline AIDS, followed by a knowing look at the camera and a cartoonish "wah-wah" sound made by a muted trombone.

In the sketch, everyone on camera breaks character and begins to laugh because of both the "wah-wah" sound effect—which the cast did not expect—and Dratch flubbing a line early on and correcting herself. The sketch was listed at number 99 as part of TV Land's "Top 100 Most Unexpected Moments in TV History."

2004–05 season
Debbie Downer appeared in a sketch in the 2004–05 season opener with Ben Affleck as the guest host. The cast members who appeared in this sketch were more composed and did not laugh out loud at Debbie's pronouncements. This trend continued throughout the rest of the season.

In future airings of the Affleck episode, the live Debbie Downer sketch was replaced by the dress rehearsal version, along with an opening title card explaining that the dress rehearsal "worked better." In the dress rehearsal, the cast all cracks up just as they did in the Lindsay Lohan episode.

The character appeared two more times that season: once at Thanksgiving dinner (with Luke Wilson as host) and another at the Oscars with Hilary Swank (playing herself). The latter sketch revealed that Debbie babysat Swank when Swank was a child. Will Forte appeared in the sketch as Swank's then-husband, Chad Lowe.

2005–06 season
In 2005, the season premiere of Saturday Night Live featured a Debbie Downer sketch at the end of the episode. Host Steve Carell's character, Bob Bummer, is just as negative, and he and Debbie fall in love.

The December 17, 2005, episode, hosted by Jack Black, included a Christmas-themed sketch showing Debbie in her childhood during a visit from Santa Claus.  This episode contradicts her debut sketch, as here she refers to her last name being "Downer."

On April 15, 2006, Debbie returned for her final appearance before Dratch departed the show, this time at a bachelorette party at a strip club in Las Vegas for her sister, played once again by host Lohan, despite not being invited in the first place.  As with the very first sketch, there is one point when the orchestra mistakenly began playing the "wah-wah" sound effect at the wrong time.

2010 appearance
During the May 8, 2010, episode hosted by Betty White, there was a Debbie Downer sketch filmed during dress rehearsal, but it was cut from the live show due to time constraints. The episode is now posted on NBC.com's Saturday Night Live page, featuring video clips of old and new sketches from the show's 35-years-and-counting tenure. A group of suburban women (all played by the guest actresses listed in addition to then-current cast member Kristen Wiig) are having a lingerie party and, as usual, Debbie Downer ruins everyone's fun. One housewife (played by Amy Poehler) yells at Debbie and asks her why she's so miserable all the time. Downer thinks back to her childhood where during her birthday, her depressed grandmother (played by White) tells her to enjoy her birthday cake now because gluten allergies run in her family.

2015 appearance
During the SNL 40th Anniversary Special, Dratch appears briefly at the beginning as Downer, telling the audience that starting a show with a musical performance decreases viewership.

2020 appearance
Debbie appears in the March 7, 2020 episode hosted by Daniel Craig, where she is a guest at a wedding, bringing her melancholy with her.  She complained about the coronavirus and, once again, feline AIDS.

Theme song
Every sketch opened with a prologue, then the theme song (and corresponding video) plays, followed by the body of the sketch. The sketch would ultimately close with the last line of the song played again (and one more negative fact from Debbie).  The song ends with an extreme close-up of Debbie's pained expression.

Theme song lyrics:
"You're enjoying your day, 
everything's going your way,
then along comes Debbie Downer.
Always there to tell you 'bout a new disease,
a car accident, 
or killer bees.
You'll beg her to spare you,
'Debbie, please!'
but you can't stop Debbie Downer!"

The Christmas sketch began with a special theme song. It featured an animated Debbie, looking much like The Grinch, and a tune similar to "You're a Mean One, Mr. Grinch". Steve Carell's Bob Bummer also had his own theme song.

SNL episodes featuring Debbie Downer

See also
 Recurring Saturday Night Live characters and sketches

References

Further reading

External links
New York Daily News: Cracking up 'Live on air by David Bianculli

Saturday Night Live sketches
Saturday Night Live in the 2000s
Saturday Night Live characters
Downer, Debbie
Downer, Debbie